The oprichnina was a state policy implemented by Tsar Ivan the Terrible in Russia between 1565 and 1572. The policy included mass repression of the boyars (Russian aristocrats), including public executions and confiscation of their land and property. In this context it can also refer to:

The notorious organization of six thousand Oprichniki, the first political police in the history of Russia.
The portion of Russia, ruled directly by Ivan the Terrible, where his Oprichniki operated.
The corresponding period of Russian history.

The term oprichnina, which Ivan coined for this policy, derives from the Russian word oprich (apart from, except).

Causes
In 1558, Tsar Ivan IV started the Livonian War. A broad coalition, which included Poland, Lithuania and Sweden, became drawn into the war against Russia. The war became drawn-out (it continued until 1583) and expensive; raids by  Crimean Tatars, Polish and Lithuanian invasions, famines, a trading blockade and escalating costs of war ravaged Russia.

In 1564, Prince Andrey Kurbsky defected to the Lithuanians and commanded the Lithuanian army against Russia, devastating the Russian region of Velikiye Luki.

Tsar Ivan began to suspect other aristocrats of readiness to betray him.

However, historian Sergey Platonov (1860–1933) argued that Ivan IV intended the oprichnina as a suppression of the rising boyar aristocracy.
Professor Isabel de Madariaga (1919–2014) expanded this idea to explain the oprichnina as Ivan's attempt to subordinate all independent social classes to the autocracy.

Establishment 
On December 3, 1564, Ivan IV departed Moscow on pilgrimage. While such journeys were routine for the throne, Ivan neglected to set in place the usual arrangements for rule in his absence. Moreover, an unusually large personal guard, a significant number of boyars, and the treasury accompanied him.

After a month of silence, Ivan finally issued two letters from his fortifications at Aleksandrova Sloboda on January 3, 1565. The first addressed the elite of the city and accused them of embezzlement and treason. Further accusations concerned the clergy and their protection of denounced boyars. In conclusion, Ivan announced his abdication. The second letter addressed the population of Moscow and claimed "he had no anger against" its citizenry. Divided between Aleksandrova Sloboda and Moscow, the boyar court was unable to rule in absence of Ivan and feared the wrath of the Muscovite citizenry. Envoys departed for Aleksandrova Sloboda
to beg Ivan to return to the throne.

Ivan IV agreed to return on condition that he might prosecute people for treason outside legal limitations. He demanded the right to execute and confiscate the land of traitors without interference from the boyar council or from the church. To pursue his investigations, Ivan decreed the establishment of the oprichnina (originally a term for land left to a noble widow, separate from her children's land). He also raised a levy of 100,000 rubles to pay for the oprichnina.

Organization
The oprichnina consisted of a separate territory within the borders of Russia, mostly in the territory of the former Novgorod Republic in the north. This region included many of the financial centers of the state, including the salt region of Staraia Russa and prominent merchant towns. Ivan held exclusive power over the oprichnina territory. The Boyar Council ruled the zemshchina ('land'), the second division of the state. Until 1568, the oprichnina relied upon many administrative institutions under zemshchina jurisdiction. Only when conflict between the zemshchina and oprichnina reached its peak did Ivan create independent institutions within the oprichnina.

Ivan also stipulated the creation of a personal guard known as the oprichniki. Originally it was a thousand strong. The noble oprichniki Aleksei Basmanov and Afanasy Viazemsky oversaw recruitment. Nobles and townsmen free of relations to the zemshchina or its administration were eligible for Ivan’s new guard. Henri Troyat has emphasized the lowly origin of the oprichnina recruits. However, historian Vladimir Kobrin has contested that a shift to the lower classes constituted a late development in the oprichnina era. Many early oprichniki had close ties to the princely and boyar clans of Russia.

Territorial divisions under the oprichnina led to mass resettlement. When the property of zemshchina nobles fell within oprichnina territory, oprichniki seized their lands and forced the owners onto zemshchina land. The oprichnina territory included primarily service estates. Alexander Zimin and Stepan Veselovsky have argued that this division left heredity landownership largely unaffected. However, Platonov and other scholars have posited that resettlement aimed to undermine the power of the landed nobility. Pavlov has cited the relocation of zemshchina servicemen from oprichnina territories onto heredity estates as a critical blow to the power of the princely class. The division of hereditary estates diminished the influence of the princely elites in their native provinces. The worst affected was the province of Suzdal which lost 80% of its gentry.

The oprichniki enjoyed social and economic privileges under the oprichnina. While zemshchina boyars lost both heredity and service land, the oprichniki retained hereditary holdings that fell in zemshchina land. Moreover, Ivan granted the oprichnina the spoils of a heavy tax levied upon the zemshchina nobles. The rising oprichniki owed their allegiance to Ivan, not heredity or local bonds.

Operations

The first wave of persecutions targeted primarily the princely clans of Russia, notably the influential families of Suzdal. Ivan executed, exiled, or tortured prominent members of the boyar clans on questionable accusations of conspiracy. 1566 saw the oprichnina extended to eight central districts. Of the 12,000 nobles there, 570 became oprichniks, and the rest were expelled. They had to make their way to the zemshchina in mid-winter; peasants who helped them were executed. In a show of clemency, Ivan recalled a number of nobles to Moscow. The Tsar even called upon zemshchina nobles for a zemskii sobor concerning the Livonian War. Ivan posed the question whether Russia should surrender the Livonian territories to recently victorious Lithuania or maintain the effort to conquer the region. The body approved war measures and advanced emergency taxes to support the draining treasury.

However, the zemskii sobor also forwarded a petition to end the oprichnina. The Tsar reacted with a renewal of the oprichnina terror. He ordered the immediate arrest of the petitioners and executed the alleged leaders of the protest. Further investigations tied Ivan Federov, leader of the zemshchina duma, to a plot to overthrow Tsar Ivan; Federov was removed from court and executed shortly thereafter.

The overthrow of King Erik XIV of Sweden in 1568 and the death of Ivan's second wife in 1569 exacerbated Ivan's suspicions. His attention turned to the northwestern city of Novgorod. The second-largest city in Russia, Novgorod housed a large service nobility with ties to some of the condemned boyar families of Moscow. Despite the sack of the city under Ivan III, Novgorod maintained a political organization removed from Russia’s central administration. Moreover, the influence of the city in the northeast had increased as the city fronted the military advance against the Lithuanian border. The treasonous surrender of the border town Izborsk to Lithuania also caused Ivan to question the faith of border towns.

Ivan IV and an oprichniki detachment instituted a month-long terror in Novgorod (the Massacre of Novgorod). The oprichniki raided the town and conducted executions among all classes. As the Livonian campaign constituted a significant drain on state resources, Ivan targeted ecclesiastical and merchant holdings with particular fervor. After Novgorod, the oprichniki company turned to the adjacent merchant city Pskov. The city received relatively merciful treatment. The oprichniki limited executions and focused primarily upon the seizure of ecclesiastical wealth. According to a popular apocryphal account, Nicholas Salos of Pskov the fool-for-Christ prophesied the fall of Ivan and thus motivated the deeply religious Tsar to spare the city. Alternatively, Ivan may have felt no need to institute a terror in Pskov due to his prior sack of the city in wake of the Izborsk treason. The dire financial condition of the state and the need to bolster the war treasury likely inspired the second raid.

Ivan IV maintained the heightened terror as he returned to Moscow. A series of particularly brutal open-air executions took place in Moscow's Pagan Square. The persecutions began to target the oprichnina leadership itself. The tsar had already refused Basmanov and Viazemsky participation in the Novgorod campaign. Upon his return, Ivan condemned the two to prison, where they died shortly thereafter. Pavlov links Ivan's turn against the higher echelons of oprichniki to the increasing number of the lower-born among their ranks. Ivan may have reacted to the apparent discontent among the princely oprichniki over the brutal treatment of Novgorod. Furthermore, class disparity may have set the lower recruits against the princely oprichniki. As Ivan already suspected the older oprichniki on the issue of Novgorod, the lower-born recruits may have advanced the new persecutions to increase their influence in the oprichnina hierarchy.

Disbandment
1572 saw the fall of the oprichnina state structure. The zemshchina and oprichnina territories were reunited and placed under rule of a reformed Boyar Council, which included members from both sides of the divided apparatus.

Scholars have cited diverse factors to explain the dissolution of the oprichnina. When the Crimean Tatars burnt Moscow in 1571 during the Russo-Crimean War, the oprichniki failed to offer serious resistance. The success of the Tatars may have shaken the Tsar’s faith in the effectiveness of the oprichnina. Ivan may have found state division ineffective in a period of war and its significant social and economic pressures. Alternatively, Ivan may have deemed the oprichnina a success; the weakening of the princely elite achieved, the Tsar may have felt that the terror had simply outlived its usefulness.

Legacy

Scholar Robert O. Crummey and Platonov have emphasized the social impact of the mass resettlements under the oprichnina. The division of large estates into smaller oprichnik plots subjected the peasants to a stricter landowning dominion. Furthermore, a new itinerant population emerged as state terror and the seizure of lands forced many peasants from their lands. The increase in itinerants may have motivated the ultimate institutionalization of serfdom by the Russian throne. The oprichnina coincided with the major social and economic crisis in Russia and, according to some contemporary and historical accounts, contributed to it.

Historian Isabel de Madariaga has emphasized the role of the oprichnina in the consolidation of aristocratic power. Resettlement drastically reduced the power of the hereditary nobility. Oprichniki landowners who owed their loyalty to the throne replaced an aristocracy that might have evolved independent political ambitions.  Alternatively, Crummey has summarized the social effects of the oprichnina as a failure. From this perspective, the oprichnina failed to pursue coherent social motives and instead pursued a largely unfocused terror. Such interpretations are derived from the 1960s works by Ruslan Skrynnikov who described the Oprichnina as the reign of terror designed to root out every possible challenge to the autocracy:

Cultural depictions
Ivan Lazhechnikov wrote the tragedy The Oprichniki, on which Tchaikovsky based his opera The Oprichnik. In turn, Tchaikovsky's opera inspired a 1911 painting by Apollinary Vasnetsov, depicting a city street and people fleeing in panic at the arrival of the oprichniki.

A fantasy variation on the Oprichnina appears in the Japanese light novel franchise Gate. It retains the name, purpose, activities, dog head motif, and even the use of brooms from the historic original.

Vladimir Sorokin's 2006 novel Day of the Oprichnik envisions a dystopian near future in which the Russian monarchy and oprichnina have been reestablished. The novel's oprichnina drive red cars with severed dog heads as hood ornaments, rape and kill dissenting nobles, and consume massive amounts of alcohol and narcotics, all while praising the monarchy and the Russian Orthodox Church.

See also

 Crisis of the late 16th century in Russia
 Cheka
 Reign of Terror
 Al-Ahbash
 Anti-clericalism in France
 NKVD
 KGB
 Okhrana
 Burning of books and burying of scholars
 literary inquisition
 Great Purge

References

Further reading

 Walter Leitsch. "Russo-Polish Confrontation" in Taras Hunczak, ed. "Russian Imperialism". Rutgers University Press. 1974, p. 140
  Oleg Gordievsky and Christopher Andrew (1999). KGB: The Inside Story of its intelligence operations from Lenin to Gorbachev (Russian language edition, Moscow, Centerpoligraph, page 21)

External links
 The New York Times Book Review - A Dystopian Tale of Russia’s Future (2011/03/13)

1560s in Russia
Political and cultural purges
1570s in Russia